Schizodelphis is an extinct genus of cetacean.

References

Prehistoric toothed whales
Prehistoric cetacean genera
Fossil taxa described in 1861
Fossils of France
Fossils of Austria